George William Cutshaw (July 29, 1886 – August 22, 1973), nicknamed "Clancy", was an American professional baseball second baseman. He played twelve seasons in Major League Baseball (MLB) from 1912 to 1923 for the Brooklyn Dodgers/Robins, Pittsburgh Pirates, and Detroit Tigers.

In 1,516 games over 12 seasons, Cutshaw posted a .265 batting average (1,487-for-5,621) with 629 runs, 195 doubles, 89 triples, 25 home runs, 653 RBI, 271 stolen bases, 300 bases on balls, .305 on-base percentage and .344 slugging percentage. He finished his career with a .965 fielding percentage as a second baseman. In the 1916 World Series, he hit .105 (2-for-19) with 2 runs and 2 RBI.

See also
 List of Major League Baseball single-game hits leaders

References

External links

1880s births
1973 deaths
Major League Baseball second basemen
Brooklyn Dodgers players
Brooklyn Robins players
Pittsburgh Pirates players
Detroit Tigers players
Bloomington Bloomers players
Oakland Oaks (baseball) players
Seattle Indians players
Notre Dame Fighting Irish baseball players
Baseball players from Illinois
People from Wilmington, Will County, Illinois